Onigbogi was a king of the Oyo Empire in West Africa who succeeded his father, the Alaafin Oluaso to become the 8th king of the Oyo.

According to some now challenged narratives in Oyo, his mother, Aruigba-Ifá left her hometown of Ota to be with her son and to serve in his office as an advisor. She brought along with her the Ifá deity to protect her son and his kingdom. However, the Oyo masses rejected her proposal of worshiping the deity and she returned to Ota. On her way back to her hometown, she was received by Alado, who provided her with supplies to continue her journey, while she initiated Alado into the Ifá divinity and conferred the rites to initiate others in return for his kindness. In latter years, the Ifá deity became prominent in Oyo and so was Ado hills, the villa of Alado.

Reign
During the time of Onigbogi, the Oyo empire and the gates of its capital were besieged with armies from the Nupe king. Though, the Yorubas and the Nupes had an amiable relationship during the time of Sango, the third king of Oyo, relationship since then had become strained. The Nupe army seized a large part of Oyo and later controlled the Oyo capital. Meantime, Onigbogi fled to a location in the land of the Borgus.

References
Samuel Johnson, Obadiah Johnson. The History of the Yorubas, From the Earliest of Times to the Beginning of the British Protectorate. p. 158

Alaafins of Oyo